Jonathan Cristian Silva (born 29 June 1994) is an Argentine professional footballer who plays as a left-back for Spanish club Granada CF, on loan from Getafe CF.

Career
Jonathan Silva is a youth exponent from Estudiantes. He made his debut for Estudiantes during the 2011–12 season.

On 9 August 2014, Silva joined Portuguese side, Sporting CP, for a €2.6 million transfer fee.

In 2016, he returned to his home country to play for Boca Juniors on loan.

On 31 January 2018, Silva moved to Serie A outfit A.S. Roma. He initially joined the club on a six-month loan contract, which included a buy obligation clause at the end of its term for a €5.7 million fee.

On 24 July 2018, Silva moved to La Liga side CD Leganés on a season loan, which includes a buy obligation clause at the end of the year for €3 million, replacing Bournemouth-bound Diego Rico and wearing the number 5 jersey. He signed permanently in July 2019, but suffered relegation at the end of the campaign.

On 31 August 2021, Silva signed a four-year contract with Getafe CF in the top tier. On 26 July of the following year, he was loaned to Granada CF in Segunda División for one year.

Career statistics

Honours

Sporting
Taça de Portugal: 2014–15
Supertaça Cândido de Oliveira: 2015

References

External links

1994 births
Living people
Association football fullbacks
Argentine footballers
Argentine expatriate footballers
Estudiantes de La Plata footballers
Sporting CP footballers
Boca Juniors footballers
A.S. Roma players
CD Leganés players
Getafe CF footballers
Granada CF footballers
Argentine Primera División players
Primeira Liga players
Serie A players
La Liga players
Segunda División players
Argentina international footballers
Argentina youth international footballers
Expatriate footballers in Portugal
Expatriate footballers in Italy
Expatriate footballers in Spain
Footballers from La Plata